Boys Ranch High School is a public high school located in the Texas Panhandle, 37 miles northwest of Amarillo, Texas and classified as a 2A school by the UIL. The school is a part of the Boys Ranch Independent School District located at Cal Farley's Boys Ranch.  As of 2013, the school is rated "Not Rated" by the Texas Education Agency.

Athletics
The Boys Ranch Roughriders compete in the following sports 

Cross Country, Football, Basketball, Wrestling, Tennis, Rodeo, Track & Baseball.

State Titles
Boys Cross Country 
1984(3A), 1987(3A), 1988(2A), 1989(2A), 1991(2A), 1993(3A), 1996(2A), 2005(2A), 2011(1A)
One Act Play 
1977(2A), 1979(2A), 1991(2A)

References

External links
Boys Ranch ISD
Cal Farley's Boys Ranch

Public high schools in Texas
Schools in Oldham County, Texas